Zheng Yanxiong (born 25 August 1963) is a Chinese politician currently serving as director of the Liaison Office of the Central People's Government in Hong Kong. Previously, he was the director of the Office for Safeguarding National Security of the CPG in the HKSAR. Zheng is known for controversial statements denouncing foreign media reporting on the Wukan protests in Shanwei in 2011, and for the crackdown of renewed protests in Shanwei in 2016.

Early life and education
Zheng was born in the Chaonan District of Shantou, Guangdong, in August 1963. In July 1984, he graduated from Guangzhou University of Chinese Medicine, where he obtained a bachelor's degree in traditional Chinese medicine. After graduation, he worked at the university. In May 1986, he joined the Chinese Communist Party (CCP). Zheng Yanxiong speaks Cantonese.

Career

Guangzhou
In September 1992, he was appointed head of the Youth Work Department of Guangdong Provincial Committee of the Communist Youth League of China. One year later, he became a member of the Standing Committee of the CPC Guangdong Provincial Committee and was appointed head of the Urban Rural Department of Guangdong Provincial Committee of the Communist Youth League of China. In 1995, he earned a master of economics degree from Sun Yat-sen University. He became deputy secretary-general of South China Branch of People's Daily in March 1998, and then secretary-general, beginning in December of the same year. In January 2002, he was appointed deputy director of the Policy Research Office of Guangdong Provincial CCP Committee.

Shanwei
In January 2005, he was transferred to Shanwei and appointed Deputy Communist Party Secretary and Secretary of Discipline Inspection Commission. On 11 January 2009, he was promoted to become mayor of Shanwei, and then Communist Party Secretary, beginning in August 2011. During his term in office, he dealt with the Wukan protests. He became well-known as party secretary in Shanwei when a protest by villagers in Wukan seeking compensation for land requisitioned by the government broke out in 2011.

Guangzhou
In July 2013, he was transferred back to Guangzhou and appointed executive vice director of Publicity Department of Guangdong Provincial Committee of the CCP. In May 2018, he became executive deputy secretary-general and director of the Policy Office of the Guangdong Provincial Committee of the CCP. In October of that same year, he was promoted to become secretary-general of the committee. On 29 January 2019, he was elected a member of the Standing Committee of the committee.

Hong Kong 
On 3 July 2020, he was appointed as the director of the newly established Office for Safeguarding National Security of the CPG in the HKSAR.

In August 2020, Zheng and ten other officials were sanctioned by the United States Department of the Treasury under Executive Order 13936 by President Trump for undermining Hong Kong's autonomy.

On 14 October 2020, the United States Department of State released a report on ten individuals who materially contributed to the failure of China to meet its obligations under the Sino–British Joint Declaration and Hong Kong's Basic Law. Zheng was on the list.

On 14 January 2023, he was appointed as the director of the Liaison Office of the Central People's Government in Hong Kong.

References

External links
Zheng Yanxiong's press conference on the Wukan protests on YouTube

1963 births
Living people
Guangzhou University of Chinese Medicine alumni
Sun Yat-sen University alumni
People's Republic of China politicians from Guangdong
Chinese Communist Party politicians from Guangdong
Individuals sanctioned by the United States under the Hong Kong Autonomy Act
Chinese individuals subject to U.S. Department of the Treasury sanctions